Robert Allen Ryan (born December 13, 1962) is an American football coach who is currently the senior defensive assistant for the Las Vegas Raiders of the National Football League (NFL). Ryan has served as a defensive coordinator or assistant coach for seven different NFL teams.  He was the linebackers coach for the New England Patriots when they won both Super Bowl XXXVI and Super Bowl XXXVIII. Ryan is the son of Buddy Ryan and the twin brother of Rex Ryan.

Early life and playing career
When his parents, Doris and Buddy Ryan, divorced in 1966, Rob and his fraternal twin, Rex, moved with Doris to Toronto. In 1974, they moved back to the United States to live with their father. He attended Stevenson High School in Lincolnshire, Illinois.

Rob played defensive end opposite his brother, Rex, at Southwestern Oklahoma State University.

Coaching career

Early career
Ryan was a graduate assistant at Western Kentucky in 1987. Then in 1988, he was an assistant coach at Ohio State. He then spent five seasons at Tennessee State, where he coached running backs (1989–91), wide receivers (1992) and the defensive line (1993).

Arizona Cardinals
Ryan first entered the NFL coaching ranks in 1994 as defensive backs coach on his father's staff for the Arizona Cardinals. He also coached Cardinals cornerbacks and safeties in 1995. With Ryan as his position coach, cornerback Aeneas Williams earned two trips to the Pro Bowl in 1994 and 1995. In 1995, the Cardinals led the NFL with 32 interceptions and 42 total takeaways. The 1994 Cardinals ranked second in the NFL total defense, second in run defense and third in pass defense.

Hutchinson Community College
After being fired by the Arizona Cardinals, Ryan served as defensive coordinator at Hutchinson Community College in 1996. Ryan's defense led the nation in total defense (228 yards-per-game) and in sacks (56). They also set a national record by forcing 49 turnovers.

Oklahoma State University
In 1997, Ryan became the defensive coordinator at Oklahoma State. While at Oklahoma State, the Cowboys defense continually ranked among the best in the nation, also he was named Coordinator of the Year by The Sporting News in 1997.

In 1999, they were ranked 10th in the nation in total defense. In 1998, they were second in the nation with 41 sacks. In his first season at Oklahoma State, the Cowboys defense finished among the nation top-20 in turnover margin, rushing defense, scoring defense, and total defense, allowing just 302.7 yards-per-game. It was an over 100-yard improvement per game from the year before and helped the Cowboys produce an 8–4 mark and capping the 1997 season with a berth in the Alamo Bowl.

New England Patriots
Prior to the 2000 season, new Patriots coach Bill Belichick hired Ryan to serve as the linebackers coach for the New England Patriots, where he spent the next four seasons. In 2003, the Patriots ranked first in the NFL in points allowed with 238, while ranking seventh overall in the NFL in total defense. Ryan's unit also contributed to one of the best scoring defenses in franchise history in 2001, as the Patriots allowed just 17 points-per-game and produced Pro Bowlers Willie McGinest and Tedy Bruschi. During his tenure the Patriots won Super Bowl XXXVI over the St. Louis Rams and Super Bowl XXXVIII over the Carolina Panthers.

Oakland Raiders
Ryan was hired as the defensive coordinator for the Oakland Raiders prior to the 2004 season. In his first season, the Raiders defense ranked 31st in the league, averaging 27.6 points allowed per game. The defense improved in his second season, averaging 23.9 points a game, and moving to 25th in the league. In 2006, the Raiders ranked third in yards-per-game but 18th in points-per-game. In 2007, the Raiders defense ranked 22nd in yards- and 26th in points-per game. In 2008, Ryan's defense ranked 24th with 388 points allowed.

Cleveland Browns
Eric Mangini named Ryan as defensive coordinator of the Cleveland Browns on January 14, 2009. In his first season in Cleveland, Ryan's defense ranked 21st in the league, with 375 points against, as teams averaged 23.4 points per game against them. In 2010, the Browns were 13th in the league with 332 points allowed.

Dallas Cowboys

Ryan was officially named the Dallas Cowboys defensive coordinator on January 19, 2011. In his first season, the Cowboys were ranked 14th in yards-per-game and 16th in points-per-game. In 2012 Dallas was ranked 19th in yards-per-game and 24th in points-per-game while only ranking 16th in sacks. On January 8, 2013, the Cowboys ended Ryan's employment with the franchise.

New Orleans Saints
In January 2013, Ryan agreed to become the defensive coordinator for the St. Louis Rams, but resigned less than five days later. In February 2013, Ryan was hired as the New Orleans Saints defensive coordinator, implementing a 3–4 defense to the team and scrapping their previous 4–3 defense. Ryan's defense finished well statistically in 2013, including fourth in fewest points-per-game and second for fewest passing yards allowed. The following year, 2014, New Orleans was near the bottom of the league in most defensive categories.

On November 16, 2015, the day after a 47–14 loss to the Washington Redskins, and with New Orleans' defense ranked last in the NFL, Ryan was fired. New Orleans defensive assistant coach Dennis Allen was appointed defensive coordinator following Ryan's dismissal.

Buffalo Bills
On January 10, 2016, the Bills announced that Ryan would be joining his brother's staff with the Buffalo Bills as assistant head coach. Under Ryan, the Bills started out 0-2, then won four straight games, including a 16-0 shutout of the New England Patriots, the first time that the Bills kept the Patriots scoreless at Gillette Stadium. The Bills entered the bye week at 4-5, then beat the Bengals and Jaguars to climb to 6-5 through week 12. They ranked 12th in the league as of week 13.

On December 27, 2016, the Bills announced they had fired Rob Ryan along with his brother Rex.

Washington Redskins
On January 30, 2019, Ryan was hired by the Washington Redskins as their inside linebackers coach. On January 5, 2020, the team announced that incoming head coach Ron Rivera had replaced Ryan with Steve Russ.

Baltimore Ravens
On January 22, 2021, Ryan was hired by the Baltimore Ravens as their inside linebackers coach under defensive coordinator Don Martindale and head coach John Harbaugh. On February 3, 2022, after only one season, Ryan and the Ravens parted ways.

Las Vegas Raiders
On February 12, 2022, Ryan was hired by the Raiders for a second time, this time as a senior defensive assistant under new defensive coordinator Patrick Graham and under new head coach Josh McDaniels. Ryan and McDaniels previously served as assistant coaches for the New England Patriots under head coach Bill Belichick from 2001 to 2003.

Broadcasting
In September 2017, Ryan was hired by Fox Sports to host a radio show with Mark Willard. In 2018, Ryan became a weekly analyst of Sky Sports' NFL coverage in the UK and Ireland.

Personal life
Ryan is married to Kristen Ryan and the couple have three children. In 2012, following in the footsteps of his brother, Ryan had lap band surgery in an attempt to lose weight. The procedure failed.

References

External links

 Washington Redskins profile

1962 births
Living people
American football defensive ends
Arizona Cardinals coaches
Buffalo Bills coaches
Cleveland Browns coaches
Dallas Cowboys coaches
Hutchinson Blue Dragons football coaches
National Football League defensive coordinators
New England Patriots coaches
Oakland Raiders coaches
Ohio State Buckeyes football coaches
Oklahoma State Cowboys football coaches
Southwestern Oklahoma State Bulldogs football players
Tennessee State Tigers football coaches
Washington Redskins coaches
Western Kentucky Hilltoppers football coaches
People from Ardmore, Oklahoma
People from Lincolnshire, Illinois
Players of American football from Illinois
Sportspeople from Toronto
Twin sportspeople
American twins
Baltimore Ravens coaches
Las Vegas Raiders coaches